Deh Askar (also Romanized as Deh ‘Askar; also known as Deh-e ‘Asgar) is a village in Asfyj Rural District, Asfyj District, Behabad County, Yazd Province, Iran. At the 2006 census, its population was 18, in 7 families.

References 

Populated places in Behabad County